Solenomelus is a genus of South American (Argentina & Chile) species of flowering plants in the family Iridaceae.  They are very closely allied to Sisyrinchium with rhizomes, flowers with a perianth tube and a style that is not divided and a single capitate stigma. The genus name is derived from the Greek words solen, meaning "tube", and melos, meaning "member".

 Species
 Solenomelus pedunculatus (Gillies ex Hook.) Hochr. - northern + central Chile
 Solenomelus segethi (Phil.) Kuntze - central Chile, southern Argentina

References

Sisyrinchieae
Iridaceae genera
Flora of South America